HMS Goliath was a 74-gun third-rate ship of the line in the Royal Navy. She was built by Adam Hayes at Deptford Dockyard and launched on 19 October 1781. She was present at the Battle of Cape St Vincent, Battle of the Nile, and Battle of Copenhagen. She was broken up in 1815.

French Revolutionary Wars

She is recorded as entering Portsmouth Harbour on 24 September 1785. She is also recorded as being at the Tagus on 21 December 1796, when the Mediterranean Fleet arrived, and sailed from there on the following 20 January with a Portuguese convoy. On 6 February, she was joined off Cape St Vincent by a squadron detached from the Channel Fleet, and was present with it at Jervis's action against the Spanish on 14 February 1797. She was commanded during that action by Captain Charles H. Knowles, and lost only eight wounded and none killed. Foley restored Goliath to order whilst Britannia slid under Knowles.

She then sailed on 31 March 1797 from Lisbon to blockade (and, on 3 July), bombard Cadiz. She sailed away from the Cadiz area on 24 May 1798 with a squadron of 10 ships of the line to join Nelson's squadron in the Mediterranean in searching for the French fleet transporting Bonaparte to Egypt, arriving with them on 7 June. She was thus present at the Battle of the Nile on 1 August, at which Foley deduced that there was enough room to sail between the shore and the stationary anchored French ships. Four other ships followed, and it was this move that can be said to have won the battle. There, on 25 August, her boats captured the French armed ketch  from under the guns of Abukir Castle; the Royal Navy took Torride into service. Goliath then remained stationed off Alexandria until at least the end of 1798.

Napoleonic Wars
On 27 January 1803, during the Blockade of Saint-Domingue, Goliath sent out a boat that captured a small French schooner that had been on her way from Santiago de Cuba to Port-au-Prince, with a cargo of sugar and $3,476 in cash. The schooner was armed with three carriage guns and some swivel guns.

The next day, Goliath sailed inshore off Cape Nicholas Mole, Haiti, to try to find two vessels seen earlier. In the action of 28 June 1803, she encountered and after a few shots captured the ship-corvette , which the British navy took into service under her French name. In Brisbane's words, Mignonne was a "remarkable fast sailing Ship Corvette". She carried sixteen long 18-pounder guns, six of which she had landed. Her crew of only 80 men was under the command of Monsieur J. P. Bargeaud, Capitaine de Fregate, and she was two days out of Les Cayes, sailing to France via the Cape.

On 6 December 1803 Goliath recaptured the Liverpool ship .

As the slaver  was returning from Havana on 9 August 1803 she encountered the French privateer Bellona, which took her captive. However, Goliath recaptured Diamond on the 12th and sent her into The Downs.

In May 1805 Goliath was in the Channel Fleet. On 15 August Goliath spotted four vessels, one to eastward and three to westward. Goliath sailed east and joined , which was in pursuit of the French brig-corvette . Goliath then helped Camilla to capture Faune.

Goliath subsequently captured Torche, which was under the command of M. Dehen, and carried 18 guns and a crew of 196 men. The French flotilla had captured Blanche on 19 July, some 150 miles north of Puerto Rico. The Royal Navy took Torche, which was a sister-ship to Mignonne, into service as HMS Torch, but never commissioned her.

On 26 July 1807 Goliath sailed as a part of a fleet of 38 vessels for Copenhagen and was present from 15 August to 20 October that year for the siege and bombardment of Copenhagen and the capture of the Danish Fleet by Admiral Gambier. She was present from May to October 1808 in the Baltic with a fleet under Vice-Admiral Sir J Saumarez, being chased on 19 August by the Russian fleet in Hango Bay. On 30 August she joined ,  and the Swedish fleet blockading the Russians in the port of Rogerswick.

Fate
She finally sailed for home, heading for The Downs, arriving in Portsmouth on 25 July 1813 and then departing only 15 days later with the West Indies convoy. Calling at Falmouth on 15 August, and Cork, she escorted the convoy across the Irish Sea and then headed back to Portsmouth, arriving on 14 August 1814, The Downs a day later, and then the naval base at Chatham, where, on 3 October 1814, she was paid off. She was broken up the following year.

Notable Commanders
Sir Hyde Parker 1781 to 1786
Archibald Dickson 1786 to 1789
Andrew Snape Douglas 1789/90
Charles Henry Knowles 1796/7
Thomas Foley 1797 to 1799
William Essington 1801/2
Charles Brisbane 1802 to 1805
Peter Puget 1807/8

Citations and references
Citations

References

 Crawford, Michael J. (Ed) (2002). The Naval War of 1812: A Documentary History, Vol. 3. Washington: United States Department of Defense. 
  
 Admiral Sir John Jervis . St Vincent College. Retrieved 1 November 2008.

External links
 
 Benyon 

Ships of the line of the Royal Navy
Arrogant-class ships of the line
1781 ships
War of 1812 ships of the United Kingdom